Krstić is a Serbian surname, a patronymic derived from the given name Krsta or Krsto. It may refer to:

Aleksandar Krstić, Serbian football agent and a former footballer
Bilja Krstić, Serbian singer
Denko Krstić (1824–1882), Ottoman Serb merchant and activist
Dobrosav Krstić, Serbian footballer
Đorđe Krstić, renowned Serbian realist painter
George Krstic, American screenwriter, producer and director
Ljiljana Krstić (1919-2001), Serbian actress
Micko Krstić (1855–1909), Ottoman rebel and Chetnik
Miloš Krstić (born 1987), Serbian professional footballer
Miloš Krstić (born 1988), Serbian professional footballer
Miroslav Krstić, Yugoslavian control theorist and a professor
Nebojša Krstić, advisor of the President of Serbia
Nenad Krstić, Serbian basketball player
Petar Krstić, Serbian composer and conductor
Petar Krstić, known as Petar Koćura, Chetnik commander in Old Serbia (1904–08)
Radislav Krstić, Chief of Staff of the Drina Corps of the Bosnian Serb Army
Todor Krstić-Algunjski (fl. 1903–18), Chetnik
 Vladimir Krstić (basketball) (born 1972), Croatian basketball coach and player
 Vladimir Krstić (comics) (born 1959), Serbian comic-book and graphic novel creator, painter and illustrator
 Vladimir Krstić (rower) (born 1959), Yugoslav rower
 Vladimir Krstić (footballer) (born 1987), Serbian footballer

See also 
Krstović, surname
Krstičić, surname
Kristić, surname
Krištić, surname

Serbian surnames